Elections were held in the organized municipalities in the Cochrane District of Ontario on October 24, 2022 in conjunction with municipal elections across the province. 

The following are the results of the mayoral races in each municipality and the council races in the City of Timmins.  (X) denotes an incumbent candidate.

Black River-Matheson

Mayor
Doug Bender was elected mayor of Black River-Matheson by acclamation.

Cochrane

Mayor
The following were the results for mayor of Cochrane.

Hearst

Mayor
Roger Sigouin, who has been mayor of Hearst since 2002 was challenged by Edward Williamson.

Fauquier-Strickland
The following were the results for mayor of Fauquier-Strickland.

Mayor

Iroquois Falls

Mayor 
The following were the results for mayor of Iroquois Falls.

Kapuskasing
Dave Plourde was re-elected by acclamation.

Mayor

Mattice-Val Côté

Mayor
The following were the results for mayor of Mattice-Val Côté.

Moonbeam

Mayor
The following were the results for mayor of Moonbeam.

Moosonee

Mayor
The following were the results for mayor of Moosonee.

Opasatika

Mayor

Smooth Rock Falls

Mayor
The following were the results for mayor of Smooth Rock Falls.

Timmins
The following are the results for mayor and city council of Timmins.

Mayor
Kristin Murray was mayor of Timmins since being appointed in August 2022. The previous mayor, George Pirie was elected in the 2022 Ontario general election for the Progressive Conservative Party of Ontario on June 2, 2022.

Timmins City Council

In Wards 1 to 4, the councillor is elected through First-past-the-post voting, with each voter casting just one vote. About a thousand votes were cast in each, barring Ward 1, which was decided by acclamation.
In Ward 5, the seats are filled through Plurality block voting with each voter casting up to four votes. With about four times the population of each of the other wards, Ward 5 saw 21,000 votes cast.

Val Rita-Harty

Mayor
The following were the results for mayor of Val Rita-Harty.

References

Cochrane
Cochrane District